Quarterly Reviews of Biophysics is a peer-reviewed scientific journal on biophysics, published by Cambridge University Press. It was established in 1968. The current chief editor is Bengt Nordén. According to the Journal Citation Reports, the journal has a 2020 impact factor of 5.318, ranking it 10th out of 71 journals in the category "Biophysics".

References

External links 
 
 

English-language journals
Biophysics journals
Publications established in 1968
Cambridge University Press academic journals